Fiorente (foaled 2008) is a Thoroughbred racehorse bred in Ireland and trained in Australia. When racing in Europe, he showed high-class form, winning the Princess of Wales's Stakes in 2012. He had greater success when campaigned in Australia, winning the Dato Tan Chin Nam Stakes and the Melbourne Cup in 2013. In 2014 he won the St George Stakes and the Australian Cup.

Background
Fiorente is a brown horse bred in Ireland by the County Meath-based Ballymacoll Stud. He was sired by Monsun, who won the Europa Preis twice and became a successful breeding stallion, siring Shirocco, Manduro, Estimate and Stacelita.

Racing career

European career
Fiorente was originally trained by Sir Michael Stoute at Newmarket, Suffolk. Unraced as a two-year-old, he ran four times as a three-year-old in 2011. He won a maiden race at Newbury Racecourse and finished second in both the Group Two King Edward VII Stakes (beaten five lengths by Nathaniel) and the Group Three Gordon Stakes.

In the following year he ran five times, recording his most important victory in the Princess of Wales's Stakes at Newmarket Racecourse in July.

Australian career
In the autumn of 2012 Fiorente was transferred to Australia to be trained by Gai Waterhouse.

In the 2012 Melbourne Cup he ran second to Green Moon. Returning to racing in the autumn he ran once over 1400 metres in the All Aged Stakes, finishing third to  All Too Hard.

In the 2013 Spring carnival he won the Dato Tan Chin Nam Stakes and then ran third behind Shamus Award in the 2013 Cox Plate. He followed this by winning the 2013 Melbourne Cup, ridden by Damien Oliver.

On 8 March, Fiorente won the Australian Cup, beating Green Moon and Shamus Award at weight-for-age. Fiorente then finished unplaced behind the New Zealand mare Silent Achiever in the Ranvet Stakes and third behind the same horse in The BMW. On 7 April it was announced that Fiorente had sustained a serious tendon injury and would be retired from racing.

Stud career

Fiorente currently stands at Sun Stud in Victoria for a service fee of A$17,600.

Pedigree

 Fiorente is inbred 4 × 4 to the stallion Danzig, meaning that Danzig appears twice in the fourth generation of his pedigree.

References

Melbourne Cup winners
2008 racehorse births
Racehorses bred in Ireland
Racehorses trained in the United Kingdom
Racehorses trained in Australia
Thoroughbred family 5-h